Poku is a surname. Notable people with the surname include

Abena Osei-Poku (born 1971), Ghanaian businessperson
Ernest Poku (born 2004), Dutch footballer
Ernest Owusu-Poku, Ghanaian police officer
Francis Adu-Poku, Ghanaian politician
Fritz Kwabena Poku (born 1945), Ghanaian diplomat
Godfrey Poku (born 1990), English footballer
Ignatius Kofi Poku Edusei (born 1963), Ghanaian politician
Kwadwo Poku (disambiguation), multiple people
Kwame Poku (born 2001), Ghanaian footballer
Kwame Poku Agyekum (born 1936), Ghanaian politician
Kwame Sanaa-Poku Jantuah (1922–2011), Ghanaian politician and diplomat
Kwasi Poku (born 2003), Canadian soccer player
Nana Poku (born 1988), Ghanaian footballer
Ofresu Kwabena Poku (born 1923), Ghanaian politician
Patricia Poku-Diaby, Ghanaian businessperson

See also
 Queen Poku (1730-1750), queen and founder of the Baoule tribe of West Africa, part of the Ashanti Empire

Surnames of Ashanti origin
Surnames of Akan origin